Guest Night was a British television programme that aired on the BBC from 1938 to 1939, with an additional set of episodes made in 1946. According to a contemporary account, it was similar to a radio programme called Men Talking.

The series was hosted by A.G. Street, with each episode featuring a meeting of guests from a particular field.

None of the episodes still exist, as methods to record live television were not developed until late 1947 and were used very rarely by the BBC until around the mid-1950s.

References

External links
Guest Night on IMDb

1930s British television series
1940s British television series
1938 British television series debuts
1946 British television series endings
Lost BBC episodes
BBC Television shows
British live television series
Black-and-white British television shows
BBC television talk shows